Mistrz is Polish for "Master" and can refer to:
 The Master (2005 film)
 The Champion (2020 film)